Água Branca may refer to:
Água Branca, Alagoas, a municipality in Alagoas, Brazil
Água Branca, Paraíba, a municipality in Paraíba, Brazil
Água Branca, Piauí, a municipality in Piauí, Brazil